Yonderland is a British sitcom television series that was broadcast on Sky 1 from November 2013 to December 2016. It was produced by Sioned Wiliam, and was created by, written by and starred the main performers from CBBC's series Horrible Histories.

Plot
33-year-old Debbie Maddox (Martha Howe-Douglas) becomes increasingly bored with her life as a suburban stay-at-home mother until an elf (Mathew Baynton) appears from a portal in her cupboard, insisting that she's the "chosen one" destined to save Yonderland. Reluctantly, Debbie agrees to meet with the Elders of the realm... only to discover that they've lost the scroll that explains what the chosen one is supposed to do. As it turns out, Yonderland is a silly, magical place, threatened by the evil Negatus (Simon Farnaby). It will take all of Debbie's resources to complete each week's quest in time to pick up her children from school.

Cast
Most of the cast play multiple roles, both physical performances and voices of puppet characters. The main cast are as follows:

Martha Howe-Douglas as:
Debbie Maddox, the main protagonist of the series, 
the voice of Rita, the smartest of the three demons that work for Negatus,
Imperatrix, the main antagonist of Series 1 & 2
Mathew Baynton as:
the Elf, Debbie's sidekick,
Chief Elder Choop, an elder,
Anous, antagonist who works for Imperatrix,
Boo, a clown parodying Pennywise the Dancing Clown, who steals cakes,
Robot, a secondary character in the series 2 finale
Jim Howick as:
Lord Elder Pressley, an elder with a striking resemblance to the American musician Elvis Presley,
the voice of Neil, the leader of the three henchdemons,
Crone, a titular character in Game of Crones
Simon Farnaby as: 
Negatus, the main antagonist of the show,
Vice-Elder Flowers, an elder with a penchant for disrobing
Laurence Rickard as:
Scribe Elder Ho-Tan an elder,
the voice of Geoff, the most incredibly idiotic of the three henchdemons,
Wizard Bradley, a wizard from the beginning of Series 1
Ben Willbond as: 
Nick the Stick, a stick,
Wise Elder Vex, an elder who mispronounces Debbie's name as "Deb-beh,"
Igor, a minor villain in series 2
Dan Renton Skinner as Peter Maddox, the husband of Debbie Maddox
Clare Thomson as various supporting characters
Stephen Fry as Cuddly Dick, former elder, and Debbie's main adversary in Series 3.

Production
On 22 March 2013, Sky1's Lucy Lumsden announced Yonderland, saying: "We are delighted to give the incredibly talented Horrible Histories cast the opportunity to write and star in a brand new show for the whole family on Sky1." The show was co-produced by  Working Title Films. Principal filming under former HH director Steve Connelly began the following May.

The show initially grew out of the desire of its creators (Baynton, Farnaby, Howe-Douglas, Howick, Rickard and Willbond) to continue working together after Horrible Histories ceased production in 2012. The new standalone troupe wanted to maintain the sketch-based, character-driven comedy style from their previous series. They quickly settled on the fantasy quest genre, with its emphasis on individual short vignettes within the larger plot, as the logical next step.

At the same time, Baynton and Willbond had been developing a film idea about an ordinary person dragged into a parallel universe – specifically, a nostalgic fantasy adventure using puppetry rather than more modern animation techniques, in the vein of Labyrinth and The NeverEnding Story." This concept in turn naturally lent itself to the casting of sole female troupe member Howe-Douglas as the central heroine, with her five male costars in multiple roles as the different characters she meets in each episode. In terms of writing together for the first time as a troupe, Howick noted to The Guardian that "[By now] we're such a tight unit, we know exactly what the humour is, and what the tone is." Baynton agreed: "It just grew very nicely out of what happens when the six of us are together in a room."

In keeping with the nostalgic, "lo-fi" tone – and in the interest of creating a more richly populated, inventive and potentially surprising world – Yonderland features numerous Muppet-style puppet characters designed and built by longtime Jim Henson associates Baker Coogan, Lifecast and Fiona Cazaly. The final series, which also featured an extra long Christmas episode had a plethora of new puppet characters designed and built by a team headed by Fiona Cazaly, including puppet makers Chris Barlow, Andy Heath, Iestin Evans, Natalie Ellnor and puppet costumes by David Brown. Explaining the decision to keep computer animation to a minimum (save for the portal to Yonderland itself), Rickard said: "Because you can make everything photo-realistic these days, it kind of takes the joy out of it. Even if it's brilliant CGI, you still know it's CGI ... you know it's not there, it's not tangible, and it's the same with comedy."

The first series was considered a critical and popular success, earning solid ratings for its timeslot. On 30 June 2014, Sky announced that the show had been recommissioned for a second series, which was filmed in autumn of the same year and began airing in July 2015.

In January 2016 it was announced that Stephen Fry would be joining the cast of Yonderland, for the third series, as "Cuddly Dick", described in the Radio Times as "a mysterious returning elder".
Series 3 began broadcasting in October 2016 on Sky1.

In February 2017 it was announced that the third season would be the last and the show had been cancelled.

Episodes

Series 1 (2013)

Series 2 (2015)

Series 3 (2016)

Reception
Yonderland met with generally positive reviews, most focusing on its uniquely all-ages nature and nostalgic references to fantasy classics. Writing in the Guardian, Sarah Hughes called the series "perfect family viewing", summing it up as "both supremely silly and very clever indeed – the sort of frothy concoction that looks effortless but is actually very hard to get right... the writing is a wonderful mix of knowing and daft", all of which earned it 16th place in the same paper's ranking of the Top 30 TV shows of 2013. Den of Geek's Rob Smedley called the show "joyously amusing... the clichés are magnificently well handled or hidden by some top gags and a cast who know just how to deliver them."

The Radio Times named the show #28 in its own Top 40 year-end list, saying further of the show's writer/creators that "Characters tended to appear once when they could each have had their own series; this gang have so many ideas and such skill in executing them that, in the long term, Python comparisons might not be out of place." Total Film magazine placed it at #25 in their Top 25 year-end list, agreeing that "It’s basically Labyrinth meets Monty Python. Yes, it’s THAT good. Though it’s essentially aimed at the kiddies, like all the best muppet-y stories, there are jokes for the adults, too." Entertainment website Cultbox UK named it their Best Comedy of the same year, "simply by virtue of being a genuinely funny comedy that the whole family can watch together... There's something for everyone in the Horrible Histories team's madcap fantasy-ribbing recipe of puppets, inventive characters, more puppets, and cheeky humour."

DVD release
The first series of Yonderland was released on Region Two DVD on 17 February 2014, by Universal Pictures UK. The second series was released on 14 December 2015. The third series was released on DVD on 5 December 2016. And the final episode, the Christmas special, was released on 20 November 2017.

References

External links 
 
 
 "Yonderlanders: Celebrating the collective art of Mathew Baynton, Simon Farnaby, Martha Howe-Douglas, Jim Howick, Laurence Rickard, and Ben Willbond" 

2010s British sitcoms
2013 British television series debuts
2016 British television series endings
Sky sitcoms
English-language television shows
British fantasy television series
British television shows featuring puppetry
Television series by Working Title Television